Bread, Love and Andalusia (Italian: Pane, amore e Andalusia, Spanish: Pan, amor y Andalucía) is a 1958 Italian-Spanish comedy film directed by Javier Setó and starring Carmen Sevilla, Vittorio De Sica and Vicente Parra. De Sica reprises his role as the Carabinieri officer Carotenuto from Bread, Love and Dreams. He travels to Seville where he falls in love with a beautiful young dancer.

Plot 
A commander of the municipal police of Sorrento (Italy) and director of the music band, makes a trip to Seville to appear at a festival, there he falls in love with a young singer and dancer.

Cast 
 Carmen Sevilla as Carmen García  
 Vittorio De Sica as Maresciallo Carotenuto  
 Vicente Parra as Paco  
 Peppino De Filippo as Peppino  
 Lea Padovani as Donna Violante Ruotolo  
 Pastora Imperio as Maestra de baile  
 Mario Carotenuto as Don Matteo Carotenuto  
 Josefina Serratosa as Tía de Carmen  
 Jacinto San Emeterio 
 Carmen Sánchez as Tía de Paco  
 Julio Goróstegui as Prior  
 María de los Ángeles Such 
 Miguel del Castillo as Músico  
 Rodolfo del Campo 
 Dolores Palumbo 
 José Nieto as Don Pablo  
 Columba Domínguez 
 Antonio as Bailarín 
 Vitoria Parra

References

Bibliography 
 Bentley, Bernard. A Companion to Spanish Cinema. Boydell & Brewer, 2008.

External links 
 

1958 comedy films
Spanish comedy films
Italian comedy films
1958 films
1950s Spanish-language films
Films directed by Javier Setó
Films scored by Alessandro Cicognini
1950s Spanish films
1950s Italian films